Dimocarpus fumatus is an Asian tree species in the family Sapindaceae.

Description
In its natural habitat, D. fumatus is a mid-canopy tropical forest tree, growing up to 35 m tall and 0.6 m dbh.
Stipules are absent; leaves are alternate, compound, with leaflets pinnately-veined and usually glabrous, sometimes with toothed margins. Flowers are about 4 mm in diameter, white-yellowish, in panicles. Fruits are drupes which are 20–25 mm long, green-yellowish and slightly warty.

Subspecies 
The Catalogue of Life and Plants of the World Online list:
 D. fumatus subsp. calcicola C.Y.Wu
 D. fumatus subsp. indochinensis Leenh.
 D. fumatus subsp. javensis Leenh.
 D. fumatus subsp. philippinensis Leenh.

References 

Dimocarpus
Flora of Indo-China
Flora of Malesia